EuroHealthNet is a non-profit partnership of organisations, agencies and statutory bodies working to contribute to a healthier Europe by promoting health and health equity between and within European countries. EuroHealthNet promotes health through its partnership framework by supporting members’ work in the EU and associated states through policy and project development, networking, and communications.

Organization 
The network’s office has been located in Brussels since 1996, and staff members are experienced in engaging with the EU institutions, decision makers and a large number of stakeholders from public authorities, civil society, the corporate sector and academia. EuroHealthNet has connections with national and regional governments, as well as with the European institutions, and therefore a good understanding of how evidence and information on health equity can be introduced in current policy making agendas.

The secretariat of around ten staff is based in Brussels and supports the partnership, which operates in three closely interlinked platforms:
 EuroHealthNet PRACTICE
 EuroHealthNet POLICY
 EuroHealthNet RESEARCH

Health inequalities and inequities in Europe 

Health inequalities can be defined as “systematic differences in health between social groups” and populations. Health inequities, on the other hand, are unfair, “avoidable inequalities” of populations within and between countries. The WHO’s Committee on the Social Determinants of Health stated that the social gradient – systematic differences between populations – was unfair; “killing people on a grand scale”.

Perhaps the clearest example of health inequalities can be seen in life expectancy. The difference between life expectancy at birth can vary by over a decade between European Union member states. For example, in 2012 the life expectancy at birth for Swedish males is 81 years, whereas in Lithuania a baby born could expect to only live until 68.4. In terms of healthy life years (years of life lived without significant disability), the gap is even greater, with Estonian males born in 2012 predicted to have 18.4 fewer healthy life years than their Maltese counterparts. These disparities in life expectancy don’t just exist at the macro scale, but can be seen right down to the neighbourhood level, with differences reaching into the decades. Such disparities are found worldwide, with research looking at demographics and improving life expectancy.

EU Health Policy 

Inequalities in health have been an important part of the work of the European Union (EU) since 1992 when specific competencies for public health were included in the Maastricht Treaty. However, as noted above large differences in health still exist between and within all countries in the EU, and some of these inequalities are widening. The EU institutions contribute to reducing health inequalities across the social gradient through a variety of strategies, policies, programmes and initiatives which affect the socio-economic determinants of health.

The Health programmes, the latest being 2014-2020, are one of the Commission’s main instruments for implementing policies aimed at reducing health inequalities.  In 2009 the European Commission recognised the challenges and importance of reducing health inequities.
In June 2010 the EU adopted its new strategy - Europe 2020: A strategy for smart, sustainable and inclusive growth. The document sets out the proposed economic, social and environmental development for the EU over the next 10 years. Although the strategy does not directly address health inequalities, it clearly acknowledges the need to fight inequalities as a prerequisite for growth and competitiveness. The EU has indeed committed to lift 20 million people out of poverty by 2020. This will be pursued through the European platform against poverty and social exclusion, one of the Commission’s seven 'flagship initiatives’ i.e. the mechanisms through which the EU 2020 strategy will be delivered. This process will undoubtedly impact health inequalities between and within EU countries.

EuroHealthNet’s Mission 

EuroHealthNet seeks to address the factors that shape health and social inequalities, building the evidence base for public health and health-related policies and health promotion interventions in particular to level up the social gradient in health. The enjoyment of the highest attainable standard of health is one of the fundamental rights of every human being without distinction of race, religion, economic or social condition. EuroHealthNet therefore stimulates and supports the implementation of integrated approaches addressing the social determinants of health by operating at all levels and across the political spectrum in relevant health, social and employment fields.

Areas of work 

The topics that EuroHealthNet works on include, but are not limited to:
 Chronic diseases
 Health equity
 Mental health
 Childhood development
 Health literacy
 Ageing
 Sustainable lifestyles
 Evidence-based policy making
 HIV/AIDS
 Social protection
 Vaccination and vaccine hesitancy

Projects 
 Determine (2007-2010)  An EU wide initiative to stimulate action to address the social and economic determinants of health (SDH) and to improve health equity in the EU and its Member States
 GRADIENT (2009-2012)   Identifying and evaluating policies which could level-up the socio-economic gradients in health among children and young people in the EU
 Spread (2011-2012)  Development of scenarios of sustainable lifestyles in 2050 focusing on sustainable living, moving, consuming and healthy living
 Crossing Bridges (2011-2012)  Advancing the implementation of Health in all Policies (HiAP) approaches in EU Member States
 Equity Action (2011-2014)  Assisting the Member States to develop tools to better enable health inequalities to be addressed in cross-government policy making
 IROHLA (2012-2015)  Identifying, validating and presenting evidence based guidelines on addressing health literacy needs of the ageing population in Europe
 DRIVERS (2012-2015)   Addressing the strategic determinants to reduce health Inequity Via 1) Early childhood development, 2) Realising fair employment, and 3) Social protection
 Quality Action (2013-2016)  Using practical Quality Assurance (QA) and Quality Improvement (QI) tools to increase the effectiveness of HIV prevention in Europe
 CHRODIS (2014-2017)  European Joint Action on Chronic Diseases and Promoting Healthy Ageing across the Life Cycle (CHRODIS-JA)
 INHERIT (2016-2019)  INter-sectoral Health and Environment Research for InnovaTion (INHERIT)
 CHRODIS PLUS (2017-2020)  CHRODIS PLUS is a high-level response by the EU to support Member States by stepping up together and sharing good practices to alleviate the burden of chronic diseases.
 Joint Action Health Equity Europe (JAHEE). JAHEE is a collaborative action between 25 European countries financed by the third Health Programme (2014-2020), a funding programme managed by the Directorate-General for Health and Food Safety (DG SANTE) and the Consumers, Health, Agriculture and Food Executive Agency (CHAFEA).
 IMMUNION (2021-2023).  IMMUNION support EU efforts to improve vaccine uptake by strengthening joint efforts amongst Coalition for Vaccination member associations and other stakeholders to deliver better vaccine education to health professionals and better information to the general public. 
 RIVER-EU (2021-2026) aims to identify and remove Health system barriers in vaccine uptake, specifically focusing on MMR (measles, mumps, rubella) and HPV (human papillomavirus) vaccination in selected underserved communities (migrants community in Greece, Turkish females and Moroccan females in the Netherlands, Ukrainian minority in Poland and Roma community in Slovakia).

See also
 Social determinants of health
 Health promotion
 Health equity
 Sustainable development

References

External links 
 EuroHealthNet | European Partnership for Health Equity and Wellbeing
 Understand Health Inequalities and Act on Them- Health Inequalites portal
 Home
 EuroHealthNet Magazine - The latest public health developments

Medical and health organizations based in Europe
Organizations established in 1996
Public health
Health promotion